Jean-Marie Larrieu (born 8 April 1965) is a French film director and screenwriter. He has directed eleven films since 1987. His film To Paint or Make Love was entered into the 2005 Cannes Film Festival. He is the brother of film director Arnaud Larrieu.

Filmography

As director / screenwriter

As editor
 Court voyage (1987 - short)
 Temps couvert (1988 - documentary short)
 Les Baigneurs (1991 - short)
 Ce jour-là (1992 - documentary)
 Bernard ou Les apparitions (1993 - short)

As cinematographer
 Court voyage (1987 - short)
 Temps couvert (1988 - documentary short)
 Ce jour-là (1992 - documentary)
 Les Fenêtres sont ouvertes (2005 - documentary)

As actor
 Antonin (1989 - short)
 Les Baigneurs (1991 - short)
 Roland's Pass (2000)
 A Man, a Real One (2003)
 The Film to Come (2013)

References

External links

1965 births
Living people
French film directors
French male screenwriters
French screenwriters